Northumberland County is an upper-tier level of municipal government situated on the north shore of Lake Ontario, east of Toronto in Central Ontario. The Northumberland County headquarters are located in Cobourg.

Municipalities
Northumberland County consists of seven municipalities (in population order):

Town of Cobourg
Municipality of Port Hope - originally part of Durham County
Municipality (town) of Trent Hills
Municipality (town) of Brighton
Township of Hamilton
Township of Alnwick/Haldimand
Township of Cramahe

The Alderville First Nation is within the Northumberland census division but is independent of county administration.

Demographics

Towns/villages

Town of Cobourg, Ontario
Municipality of Port Hope, Ontario
Municipality of Brighton, Ontario
Municipality of Trent Hills, Ontario
Cramahe Township, Ontario
Hamilton Township, Ontario
Alnwick/Haldimand Township, Ontario

History
Together with Durham County, it formed the Newcastle District from 1802 to 1849 and the United Counties of Northumberland and Durham from 1850 to 1973. Effective January 1, 1974, part of Durham County was merged with Ontario County to create the Regional Municipality of Durham. At that time, Northumberland reverted to a standalone county.

It was first aggressively settled by United Empire Loyalists fleeing the former 13 British American Colonies in the late 18th century. The Crown provided plots to the settlers for nominal sums (with the stipulation of making the land productive in a set number of years) or free to those who had served against the American Colonial Army. Following the War of 1812, many port towns, Port Hope and Cobourg in particular, became important centres for commercial activity and a landing point for European immigrants arriving on steamers.

Recreation
There are two provincial parks in Northumberland County: Presqu'ile Provincial Park in Brighton, and Ferris Provincial Park in Campbellford.  There are also several other protected natural areas and forests, including Ganaraska Forest, Northumberland County Forest, Goodrich-Loomis Conservation Area, and Peter's Woods. Waterfront campsites and cottages are located along Lake Ontario and Rice Lake.

Northumberland County has various cycling, hiking and other outdoor trails. The Waterfront Trail along Lake Ontario passes through Northumberland County, as does the Trans-Canada Trail.  The Northumberland portion of the Trans-Canada Trail spans from Hastings to Hoard's Station in Campbellford, following an abandoned rail line. Halfway through Campbellford, the trail joins the 6 km long Rotary Trail situated alongside the Trent River. There are five signed bike routes: Glorious Ganaraska, Rice Lake Ramble, Shelter Valley, Presqu’ile Promise and Trent River Truckin'.  The Northumberland County Forest offers various trails available for hiking, cycling, horseback riding, ATVing, off-road motorcycling, cross-country skiing, snowmobiling, snowshoeing as well as a 3.2 km, accessible  Universal Trail. The Ganaraska Hiking Trail starts in Port Hope and goes north towards the Bruce Trail.

There are three theatres in Northumberland County: Westben in Campbellford, the Capitol Theatre in Port Hope, and the Park Theatre & Performing Arts Centre in Cobourg.  Festivals in Northumberland include the Warkworth Maple Syrup and Float Your Fanny Down the Ganny festivals in early spring, the Cobourg Sandcastle Festival and Incredible Edibles Festival in the summer, and the Cultivate Food and Vintage Film Festivals in the fall.

See also
 List of municipalities in Ontario
 List of townships in Ontario

Notes

References

External links

 
Counties in Ontario